See also Bullfight (Manet), Bullfight – Death of the Bull, and The Dead Man (Manet)

The Bullfight (La Corrida) is an 1864-1865 oil on canvas painting by Édouard Manet, now in the Frick Collection in New York. Its dimensions are 48x60.4 cm. Like The Dead Man, it was originally part of a larger composition entitled Episode in a Bullfight. The scene was inspired by a trip that Manet took to Spain in the fall of 1865 for ten days. He described the bullfight he witnessed in a letter to Charles Baudelaire as "one of the finest, most curious and most terrifying sights to be seen."

The cutting 
After having recut Épisode, Manet then reworked L'Homme mort, and cut La Corrida in such a way as to keep three bullfighters at the barrier: the first title chosen for this work was Toreros en action. But if he wanted to keep the men on foot, he had to cut almost the entire bull. The artist decided instead to cut off the feet of the bullfighter on the left and trim the crowd in the stands.

Bibliography
 Anne Coffin Hanson, Manet and the Modern Tradition, New Haven and London, Yale University Press, 1977
 Theodore Reff, Manet's Incident in a Bullfight, New York: The Council of The Frick Collection Lecture Series, 2005
  Françoise Cachin, Charles S. Moffett and Juliet Wilson Bareau, Manet 1832-1883, Paris, Réunion des Musées Nationaux, 1983, 544 pp.
  Adolphe Tabarant, Manet et ses œuvres, Paris, Gallimard, 1947, 600 pp.
  Théophile Thoré-Burger and William Bürger, Salons de William Bürger, 1861-1868, avec une préface par Théophile Thoré, vol. 2, t. II, Paris, Jules Renouard, 1870
  Claude Pichois and Jean Ziegler, Baudelaire, correspondance, vol. 2, t. II, Paris, Gallimard, 1973

References

Paintings by Édouard Manet
1864 paintings
1865 paintings
Paintings in the Frick Collection
Bullfighting in art